The 1996 Girabola was the 18th season of top-tier football competition in Angola. Atlético Petróleos de Luanda were the defending champions.

The league comprised 13 teams, the bottom one of which were relegated.

Primeiro de Agosto were crowned champions, winning their 6th title, while Nacional de Benguela were relegated.

César Caná of Académica do Lobito finished as the top scorer with 15 goals.

Changes from the 1995 season
Relegated: FC de Cabinda, Sonangol do Namibe, Sporting de Luanda, Sporting do Lubango
Promoted: Benfica do Huambo, Sagrada Esperança, Saneamento Rangol

League table

Results

Season statistics

Top scorer
 César Caná

Champions

References

External links
Federação Angolana de Futebol

Girabola seasons
Angola
Angola